Slaughter to Prevail is a Russian deathcore band originally from Yekaterinburg, and based in Orlando, Florida. The group debuted with an EP titled Chapters of Misery in 2015 and followed up two years later with a full-length album, Misery Sermon. Their second album, Kostolom, released in 2021. The band is currently signed to Sumerian Records and have toured through the US, Europe, and Asia.

History 
Prior to forming Slaughter to Prevail, British guitarist Jack Simmons was a member of London-based deathcore act Acrania, whereas Russian vocalist Alex Terrible gained a cult following online for his YouTube vocal cover videos. Terrible was previously a member of the Russian deathcore act We Are Obscurity, which disbanded after failing to find a record label. Simmons recruited Terrible along with Russian drummer Anton Poddyachy to form what would become Slaughter to Prevail. They released an EP titled Chapters of Misery in 2015, signed to Sumerian Records in 2016, and re-released Chapters of Misery with a new song, "As the Vultures Circle," as their debut release under the label. In May 2016, it was announced that Slaughter to Prevail would be joining bands such as Cannibal Corpse for Summer Slaughter 2016.

Slaughter to Prevail released their first full-length album, Misery Sermon, in 2017, inspired by the hate and misery within themselves and around them.

Slaughter to Prevail was once again invited to perform at Summer Slaughter 2017 alongside bands such as The Black Dahlia Murder and Dying Fetus but was ultimately unable to make the tour due to visa issues. Slaughter to Prevail was also invited to join Suicide Silence on their 10th anniversary tour of their album The Cleansing and was set to perform in the USA and Canada in November and December 2017. However, the band once again encountered visa issues due to the American visa freeze for Russians.

In 2018, Whitechapel invited Slaughter to Prevail to join their Ten Years of Exile tour alongside Chelsea Grin and Oceano.

The band released the singles "Agony" and "Demolisher" in 2019 and 2020 respectively to widespread popularity, with Metal Injection saying "The release of 'Demolisher' was an event in the deathcore community. Countless Youtube reaction videos lauded the impossibly deep growls and brutal instrumentation." In 2021, the band released another single, "Baba Yaga," named after a being from Slavic folklore. It was elected by Loudwire as the 3rd best metal song of 2021. The band released yet another single, "Zavali Ebalo." Their second full-length album, Kostolom, was released on August 13th, 2021, and included the four singles.

In a November 30 interview, Terrible expressed dissatisfaction with the band's deal with Sumerian Records, attributing it to being "in a fool's paradise" when they started and to signing without legal advisors. He said the band would likely sue to terminate their contract and continue independently, but "the issue is pending right now." 

On February 26, 2022, the band released a statement on Facebook condemning the Russian invasion of Ukraine which began two days earlier. Terrible issued another statement on behalf of the band via Instagram and Youtube on March 1, also urging viewers to "not make the whole Russian people an accomplice." On August 9, the band released the song "1984," inspired by the George Orwell novel, in protest of the government and the war. The band relocated to Orlando, Florida three months prior due to the effects of the war and previous suppression by the Russian government, as well as for the stronger U.S metal scene.

Style 
Slaughter to Prevail has been described mainly as deathcore, with a major focus on Terrible's extremely deep guttural vocals. Terrible has mentioned that the band has been influenced by other prominent deathcore bands such as Suicide Silence, Bring Me the Horizon, and Carnifex. Kostolom marked a stylistic shift, with reviewers noting influence from nu metal such as Slipknot's Iowa.

Slaughter to Prevail's lyrics are written in both Russian and English, with both languages often appearing in the same song.

Band members

Current
 Aleksandr "Alex Terrible" Shikolai (Александр Шиколай) —  lead vocals (ex-We Are Obscurity) (2014–present)
 Mikhail "Mike" Petrov (Михаил Петров) — bass guitar (My Autumn) (2016–present)
 Evgeny Novikov (Евгений Новиков) — drums (Katalepsy) (2018–present)
 Jack Simmons — lead guitar (Acrania, Hollow Prophet) (2014–2017, 2020—present)
 Dmitry "Dima" Mamedov (Дмитрий Мамедов) — rhythm guitar (We Are Obscurity) (2015, 2021–present)

Former
 Anton Poddyachy – drums (played in Lost in Alaska & We Are Obscurity) (2014–2018)
 Maxim Zadorin – guitar (ex-We Are Obscurity)
 Slava Antonenko – guitar (played in Lost in Alaska & With Ink Instead of Blood) (2014–2016)
 Filipp Kucheryavyh – bass (2014–2016)
 Sam Baker – guitars (2015)
 Justin Czubas - guitars (played in Lunaform & Shelia) (2018)
 Jared Delgado – guitars (played in The Hopewell Furnace) (2017–2018)
 Robert Brown – guitars (played in So This Is Suffering) (2018–2020)

Timeline

Discography

EPs 
 Chapters of Misery (2015)

Studio albums 
 Misery Sermon (2017)
 Kostolom (2021)

Singles 
 "1984" (2022)

References

External links 
 Official website
 Slaughter to Prevail at VK

Russian deathcore musical groups
Musical groups from Yekaterinburg
Sumerian Records artists
Musical groups established in 2014
2014 establishments in Russia
Russian activists against the 2022 Russian invasion of Ukraine